Beechwood Village is a home rule-class city in Jefferson County, Kentucky, United States. The city was formally incorporated by the state assembly in 1950. The population was 1,324 at the 2010 census, up from 1,173 at the 2000 census.

Geography
It is bordered to the north by Woodlawn Park and on all other sides by St. Matthews.

The southern boundary of Beechwood Village is U.S. Route 60, and Interstate 264 touches the northeast end of the city.

Demographics

At the 2000 census, there were 1,173 people, 532 households and 336 families residing in the city. The racial makeup of the city was 97.78% White, 0.43% Black or African American, 0.60% Asian, 0.17% from other races, and 1.02% from two or more races. Hispanic or Latino of any race were 0.68% of the population.

There were 532 households, of which 25.0% had children under the age of 18 living with them, 55.1% were married couples living together, 6.4% had a female householder with no husband present, and 36.8% were non-families. 32.3% of all households were made up of individuals, and 16.9% had someone living alone who was 65 years of age or older. The average household size was 2.20 and the average family size was 2.81.

19.4% of the population were under the age of 18, 4.7% from 18 to 24, 31.6% from 25 to 44, 23.0% from 45 to 64, and 21.3% who were 65 years of age or older. The median age was 41 years. For every 100 females, there were 85.6 males. For every 100 females age 18 and over, there were 79.8 males.

The median household income was $52,500 and the median family income was $66,250. Males had a median income of $46,705 compared with $34,000 for females. The per capita income for the city was $28,908. About 0.9% of families and 1.2% of the population were below the poverty line, including none of those under age 18 and 0.9% of those age 65 or over.

References

External links
City of Beechwood Village official website

Cities in Kentucky
Cities in Jefferson County, Kentucky
Louisville metropolitan area
Populated places established in 1950
1950 establishments in Kentucky